Harry Joseph Jacoby (September 2, 1910 – November 9, 1993) was an American football and basketball coach and athletics administrator. He served as the third head football coach at Boise Junior College—now Boise State University—coaching in five seasons. His first tenure lasted from 1938 through the first four games of 1941, when he was called by the United States Army for active duty at Fort Warren, Wyoming. The final three games in 1941 were coached by George "Stub" Allison, who also took over athletic director duties. After World War II ended, Jacoby resumed coaching duties for the Broncos in 1946. He compiled an overall record of 14–15–2. Jacoby was also the head basketball coach at Boise Junior College for two seasons, from 1939–40 to 1940–41, tallying a mark of 24–21.

A native of Bonners Ferry, Idaho, Jacoby played college football at the University of Idaho. He coached at Soda Springs High School in Soda Springs, Idaho and then returned to Idaho as an assistant to Ted Bank.

Head coaching record

Football

References

External links
 

1910 births
1993 deaths
American football halfbacks
Boise State Broncos football coaches
Boise State Broncos men's basketball coaches
Idaho Vandals football coaches
Idaho Vandals football players
High school basketball coaches in Idaho
High school football coaches in Idaho
United States Army personnel of World War II
People from Bonners Ferry, Idaho
Coaches of American football from Idaho
Players of American football from Idaho
Basketball coaches from Idaho